Wetton Mill railway station was a minor station on the Leek and Manifold Light Railway serving the nearby Wetton Mill in Wetton, Staffordshire. The site is now part of the Manifold Way and runs past the mill today which is now a private and commercial residence.

Route

References

Disused railway stations in Staffordshire
Railway stations in Great Britain opened in 1904
Railway stations in Great Britain closed in 1934
1904 establishments in England
1934 disestablishments in England
Former Leek and Manifold Light Railway stations